An Urgent Operational Requirement (UOR) is a system used by the  British Ministry of Defence (MOD) to obtain urgent equipment for operations.
Supplementing the MOD's long term planned equipment programme are Urgent Operational Requirements (UOR), funded by extra Treasury money.

Urgent Operational Requirements (UORs) arise from the identification of previously unprovisioned and emerging capability gaps as a result of current or imminent operations or where deliveries under existing contracts for equipment or services require accelerating due to an increased urgency to bring the capability they provided into service. These capability shortfalls are addressed by the urgent procurement of either new or additional equipment, enhancing existing capability, within a time scale that cannot be met by the normal acquisition cycle.

Examples of this include;

L129A1 Sharpshooter rifle - procured when British Army operations in Afghanistan found that ground units required a weapon platform with accurate lethality out past the range of the standard issue rifle the NATO 5.56mm chambered L85A2.

MTP Camouflage Uniform - during the same operations as above, British combat units found their current issues of either woodland or desert DPM where unsuitable for the varied terrain they found themselves in. After successful trials of Crye Precisions MultiCam the decision was made to procure a multicam style camouflage which later became standard issue.

Mk 7 Helmet - introduced in June 2009 the MK 7 was procured to allow the soldier more practical head protection when it was found the previous issue MK 6 interfered with new body armour and could tip over the soldiers eyes obscuring vision when lying prone. Now succeeded by the MK 8.

References

Ministry of Defence (United Kingdom)